Jotamont or Jorge Fernandes Monteiro (October 1, 1912 - November 21, 1998) was a Cape Verdean musician and composer. He was born on a boat bound for the United States of America, where his parents hoped to find better living conditions. He attended the Gil Eanes lyceum in Mindelo and a Lisbon conservatory.  He was a virtuoso on the trumpet.

Mornas
Jotamont composed a number of mornas, a music and dance genre from Cape Verde. The English translation of the titles is in brackets.

São Cente (Saint Vicent)
Mindelo nha terra (Mindelo, Our Land)
'Nha terra bô ca tá imaginá
Fidjo Magoado
Êsse ê quê Mindelo nôs querido cantim
Dez grãozinhos de terra
Lolinha
Nôs Mãe
Engenheiro humano (Baptista de Sousa)

Books

Música Caboverdeana - Mornas for the piano, 1987 
Mornas e contra-tempos - Coladeras from Cabo Verde, 1987 
Músicas de Cabo Verde - Mornas from Eugénio Tavares; transcripts for Jótamont, 1987 
Música Caboverdeana - Mornas from Francisco Xavier da Cruz, 1987

External links
 Jotamont: About the life of music

1912 births
1998 deaths
Cape Verdean musicians
Cape Verdean composers